Jean-Yves Haby (born 5 January 1955) is a French politician.

Haby was born on 5 January 1955, in Dombasle-sur-Meurthe. He was elected to the National Assembly between 1988 and 1997, representing Hauts-de-Seine's 3rd constituency on behalf of the Union for French Democracy.

References

1955 births
Living people
Members of Parliament for Hauts-de-Seine
Deputies of the 9th National Assembly of the French Fifth Republic
Deputies of the 10th National Assembly of the French Fifth Republic
Union for French Democracy politicians
People from Meurthe-et-Moselle